Ménilmontant  is a 1926 film written and directed by Dimitri Kirsanoff that takes its name from the Paris neighborhood of the same name.

Summary
The film is silent and contains no intertitles. It begins with a flurry of quick shots depicting the axe murder of the parents of the protagonists, two sisters.  As young women, they are portrayed by Nadia Sibirskaïa, Kirsanoff's first wife, and Yolande Beaulieu; their mutual love interest is played by Guy Belmont.

Style
Like many of the early French avant-garde films, Ménilmontant uses a mixture of styles and techniques. The film also uses many techniques that were relatively new at the time, including double exposure.<ref>David Bordwell & Kristin Thompson, 1993. Film History: An Introduction. New York: McGraw-Hill.</ref>

Reception
Film critic Pauline Kael wrote that Ménilmontant'' was her favorite film of all time.

References

External links

Ménilmontant at Internet Archive
Ménilmontant on FilmAffinity

1926 films
French silent short films
Films directed by Dimitri Kirsanoff
French black-and-white films